Lyden is a surname. Notable people with the surname include:

Jacki Lyden (born 1953 or 1954), American news reporter
Jordan Lyden (born 1996), Australian footballer
Mitch Lyden (born 1964), American baseball player
Pierce Lyden (1908–1998), American actor
Robert Lyden (1942–1986), American actor
Ross Lyden (born 2000), Scottish footballer